Huguette Bello (born 24 August 1950) is a French politician from Réunion.

A former member of the Reunionese Communist Party (PCR), she split with the Communists in 2012 and formed her own party, For Réunion (French: Pour la Réunion, PLR).

She is a deputy in the French National Assembly, where she sits in the Gauche démocrate et républicaine (Democratic and Republican Left) parliamentary group, which includes the French Communist Party (PCF) and other left-wing deputies. She had previously belonged, from 1997 to 2002, to the 
Radical-Citizen-Green (Radical-citoyen-vert (fr))  parliamentary group, which included, among others, the Reunionese Communist Party, the Greens, and the Radical-Socialists, but not the PCF.

In 1997, Bello became Réunion's first ever female parliamentary deputy when she was elected to represent the 2nd constituency of the island in the French National Assembly. She was re-elected in 2002, and for a third term in 2007, on which occasion she gained 34,911 votes (59.6%) in the second round.
She was re-elected in 2012 and 2017.

From March 2008 to 2014, Bello was also the mayor of Réunion's largest commune, Saint-Paul. In the second round of voting in the French municipal elections of 2008, the list of candidates headed by Bello defeated that of the sitting UMP mayor by a margin of just 0.3%. In 2020 Bello won mayorship election in Saint-Paul once again.

External links

References

1950 births
Living people
French communists
Politicians of Réunion
Members of the Regional Council of Réunion
Women mayors of places in France
Communist Party of Réunion politicians
Women from Réunion in politics
Women members of the National Assembly (France)
Deputies of the 12th National Assembly of the French Fifth Republic
Deputies of the 13th National Assembly of the French Fifth Republic
Deputies of the 14th National Assembly of the French Fifth Republic
Deputies of the 15th National Assembly of the French Fifth Republic
21st-century French women politicians
People from Saint-Pierre, Réunion
Members of Parliament for Réunion